Canadian recording artist Tory Lanez has released seven studio albums, Twenty mixtapes, four extended plays (EP), eighty-nine singles (including forty-nine as a featured artist) and more than eighty music videos. In 2009, Lanez began his career by releasing his debut mixtape, T.L 2 T.O. He received major recognition from the mixtape, Conflicts of My Soul: The 416 Story, released in August 2013, which included guest appearances from Roscoe Dash and Kirko Bangz. In 2014, he released Lost Cause which led to his first tour, the Lost Cause tour. Lanez collaborated with the WeDidIt collective on the Cruel Intentions EP in 2015. Chixtape III and The New Toronto were released later that year. He released his debut album I Told You, in 2016.

Albums

Studio albums

Commercial mixtapes

Mixtapes

EPs

Singles

As lead artist

As featured artist

Promotional singles

Other charted songs

Guest appearances

Songwriting credits

Music videos

As lead artist

As featured artist

Notes

References

Hip hop discographies
Discographies of Canadian artists